Chilocorus similis is a species of red-spotted lady beetles belonging to the family Coccinellidae, subfamily Chilocorinae.

This beetle is an endemic Italian species, present in Italian mainland. It preys on scale insects living on Euonymus species. The elytra are brown-black, with two reddish round sposts. This lady beetle was deliberately introduced to the United States by Marlatt in 1902 to control the San Jose Scale, an early example of biocontrol.

References

External links
 Biolib
 Fauna Europaea

Coccinellidae
Beetles of Europe
Endemic fauna of Italy
Beetles described in 1790
Taxa named by Pietro Rossi